Meredith McGrath and Larisa Savchenko were the defending champions but lost in the quarterfinals to Laurence Courtois and Nancy Feber.

Kristie Boogert and Jana Novotná won in the final 6–4, 6–3 against Julie Halard-Decugis and Nathalie Tauziat.

Seeds
Champion seeds are indicated in bold text while text in italics indicates the round in which those seeds were eliminated.

 Meredith McGrath /  Larisa Savchenko (quarterfinals)
 Lori McNeil /  Helena Suková (semifinals)
 Kristie Boogert /  Jana Novotná (champions)
 Julie Halard-Decugis /  Nathalie Tauziat (final)

Draw

External links
 1996 Open Gaz de France Doubles Draw

Open GDF Suez
1996 WTA Tour